Esteban Masseilot (born 19 June 1942) is a Uruguayan rower. He competed in the men's coxless pair event at the 1968 Summer Olympics.

References

1942 births
Living people
Uruguayan male rowers
Olympic rowers of Uruguay
Rowers at the 1968 Summer Olympics
Sportspeople from Paysandú
20th-century Uruguayan people